Kim Hong-Yul (born 1984), better known by his stage name Hong 10, is a Korean b-boy. He is part of the Korean crew Flow XL (formally known as Drifterz), 7Commandoz worldwide and represents the Red Bull BC One All Stars.

Biography

Name

The name Hong10 comes from using a Korean language homonym and an English language pun. The second syllable of his name, Yul (but the name had been misspelled as 'Yeol') , has the same pronunciation as the Korean pronunciation for the number ten. Therefore, pronouncing the phrase Hong10 in Korean will be the same pronunciation as his real name, Hong-Yul. However, this nickname is always pronounced in English, so he is referred to as hongten regardless of the language context - whether Korean or English or otherwise.

Crew 

Hong10 was in the crew Expression (with which he won the Battle of the Year title in 2002) and is currently in a crew called Drifterz and a project team named Project Soul and Project Korea while he also performs as a solo dancer. Recently he and his good friend Bboy Differ founded a crew called 7Commandoz with the world-renowned bboys Ronnie, Differ, Skim, Wing, Dyzee and Phil Wizard. Its former member, Bboy Menno, left the crew. The crew members are known for their originality and futuristic style.
Hong10 is one of Red Bull All Stars since 2010.

Hong10 had represented Jinjo Crew with fellow 7Commandoz members  Skim and Wing in several competitions, such as the UK B-Boy Championships 2009, Battle of the Year (2010, 2018), and R-16 Korea in both 2011 and 2012. Hong10 and Jinjo members are very close. They share the same studio and he takes a part in performance with Jinjo  but Hong10 is not the member of Jinjo .

Moves 

Some of his signature moves include  the spinning airchair, switching halos, handcuff mills to headspin drills, chair flares, and his signature  freeze the Hong10 Freeze  Hong10 is also known as The king of Halo freeze  because of his many Hong10 (halo) freeze variations.

History 

He first became a well-known bboy during 2002 when he exploded onto the scene being part of the Korean crews that won the then two most prestigious dance competitions in the world - Battle of the Year International and the UK B-Boy Championships. He has also done well in many individual competitions, as a red bull BC one all star winning in 2006, São Paulo Brazil and took the title in 2013 in his hometown, Seoul (South Korea). At the same time he is sometimes referred to as the famous 'runner up', having been a finalist at many competitions including three times at the UK B-boy Championships. In recent years, Hong10 has served in the Korean Army right after the prestigious RedBull BC One Moscow 2011. And at the Battle bled he lost against Bboy Finger ( France )
Although his army time restricted his time to go overseas to competitions, time to time, he acted as a judge for  many local tournaments and sometimes even compete if they are within South Korea.
After completed his military service he came back to the bboy scene, won the Red Bull BC One title in 2013.

List of notable achievements

Significant achievements in major events are highlighted in bold text. Although Hong has more titles on his name, these are some notable achievements:

2001
 Performance in Dance Dynamite, Japan
 Be.B-Boy, Japan (winner)
 Tokyo Dance Delight, Japan (Runner-up, Performance)
 Hong 10 Vs Juan Diego 
 Juan Diego Vs Lil YI Pobre 8)

2002
 Style War, Korea (winner)
 Performance in Big Wax, Japan
 Hip Hop Connection B-boy Master Mixed Battle Vol.1, Korea (winner)
 B-Boy Unit Vol.4, Korea (winner)
 B-Boy Master Championship, Korea (winner)
 Solo battle with Remind in HipHop Connection Vol.3, Korea
 Performance in Dance Dynamite, Japan
 Be.B-Boy, Japan (winner)
 Performance in Asian Comment, Denmark
 Guest battle in Jam 2 The Beat, Denmark
  Battle Of The Year 2002, Korea (champion)
 International Battle Of The Year 2002, Germany (champion)
 International UK B-Boy Championships 2002 Solo (runner-up)
 International UK B-Boy Championships 2002 Crew (champion)
 Freestyle Session Japan (runner-up)
 Take part in Sony Net.MD TV advertisement, New Zealand
 Voted Best B-Boy of the Year

2003
 Distinguished service prize, Honor of Dance 2003, Korea
 Featured on <6'o Clock Focused Issues> MBC TV programme, Korea
 B-Boy Master Mixed Battle Vol.3 Korea (winner)
 Performance in <Big Wax>, Fukuoka Japan
 Hiphop Planet, France (winner)
 Pro-Am Euro, France (winner)
 Judge & Special Guest Battle at the Netherland Tournament

2004

 Performance in <Funky Funky> the musical, Korea
 B-Boy Unit Vol.6, Korea (winner)
 B-Boy Challenge Vol.4, Korea (winner)
 Guest performance at "Breakin Convention", UK
 Guest performance at "Fitness Festival", Italy
 Guest performance "Korea Hip Hop Nite", Taiwan
 Judge of "B-Boy Battle", Taiwan
 Guest performance in the launching show of iPod, Korea
 Performed in the opening of <Korean Broadcasting Awards>, Korea
 International UK B-Boy Championships 2004 Solo (runner-up)
 International UK B-Boy Championships 2004 Crew (champion)
 Freestyle Session Korea (champion)
 B-Boy Challenge Grand Championship, Korea (winner)
 Performance at Nike, Inc. LeBron event, Korea
 Korean representative in "Free Style Session World Final", Japan

2005
 Participation in "Match One's Skill", Korea
 Street Dance Summer Jam, Taiwan (winner)
 Stand-in performance in TV drama <Nonestop>, Korea
 Opening performance for <EBS Robot Battle Korea>, Korea
 Event performance in "Nike 5,6,7,8", Korea
 Yongmasan Battle, Korea (Judge)
 Performance in "Breakin' Convension", UK
 Red Bull BC One 2005, Germany (runner-up)
 K.O.B.E, Japan (winner)
 Battle Of The Year South East Asia 2005, Taiwan (Judge)
 Hip Hop World Challenge 1on1, Germany (winner)
 Red Bull Street Battle, Hong Kong (Judge)
 International UK B-Boy Championships Solo (runner-up)
 International UK B-Boy Championships Crew (champion)
 KMTV Original Move 1on1 vol.7, Korea (winner)
 Motion-capture model for PSP game <B-Boy>, UK
 Judge of <MBK 3on3 Battle>, Thailand
 The Notorious IBE 2005 (Korea)

2006
 One Of The Move vol.2, Korea (winner)
 Armory Cup Korea 2006, Korea (runner-up)
 Performance in "Breakin Convension", UK
 SBS "Hope TV" tournament, Korea (winner)
 Judge of "Top of Top", Korea
 Took part in KBS TV commercial, Korea
 Performance in Movement Concert (Drifterz Crew)
 Red Bull Break in Battle, Ireland (runner-up)
 Took part "Vita 500" commercial, Korea
 UK B-Boy Championships 2006, Korea (champion)
 Battle Of The Year 2006, Korea (champion)
 Performance in <B-Boy Park>, Korea
 Motion-capture model for the game <Groove Party>, Korea
 International Battle Of The Year 2006 Crew (semi-finals)
 International UK B-Boy Championships 2006 Crew (runner-up)
 Red Bull BC One 2006, Brazil (champion)
 Performance Of The Year, Korea (winner)

2007
 B-Boy Unit Vol.9, Korea (runner-up)
 Red Bull Beat Battle (winner)
 Red Bull BC One 2007,  South Africa (semi-finals)

2008
 Red Bull BC One 2008, France (Judge)
 The Notorious IBE 2008 (Korea/Japan)

2009
 Jincheon 2009 (winner) (7 Commandoz)
 Battle of the Year,  Taiwan 2009 (Judge)
 Battle of the Year,  Singapore 2009 (Judge)
 2-Oh-Sick Usa 2009 (Steven Chhuon, Jovy Neak, Andy Phriep, j-mart, dino dylan)
 The Notorious IBE 2009 (Korea)

2010
 2010 Vancouver Battle of T.N.G - Just Battle 3 on 3 (Judge)
 Be.B-Boy, osaka3on3 (winner)
 Be.B-Boy, osaka1on1 (winner)
 International Battle of the Year 2010, Germany (champion)(Jinjo )

2011
 Temple O'Style (winner) (7 Commandoz)
 Break The Floor, France (champion) (7 Commandoz)
 International R-16 Korea 2011 (champion) (Jinjo )
 Red Bull BC One 2011, Russia

2012
 Road of Street 2 vs 2 (winner)
 R-16 Korea Korea Eliminations (champion) (Jinjo )
 International R-16 Korea Solo (quarter-finals)
 World B-Boy Fighterz 2012 1 vs 1
 Red Bull Bc One Crew Vs Crew (Jinjo Crew ) vs (The Happy Best Crew)
 The Notorious IBE 2012 (Red Bull BC One All Stars)

2013
 Red Bull BC One 2013, Korea (champion)

2014
 Red Bull BC One 2014, France
 New Taipei BBoy City 2014 (winner) (7 Commandoz)
 Outbreak Europe 2014 (Judge)

2015
  Floor Wars 2015, Denmark (champion) (7 Commandoz)
 Chelles Battle Pro 2015 (Judge)
  Silverback Open Championships Champion (7 Commandoz)
  Silverback Open Championships Solo (semi-finals)
  Freestyle Session Champion  (7 Commandoz)
 Red Bull BC One India Cypher 2015 (Judge)

2006 others
 2006 UK: Breakin Convension, Showcase-
 2006 Korea: Top Of Top, Judge-
 2006 Korea: "KBS CF" -
 2006 Korea: "Vita 500 CF" -
 2006 Korea: BBoy Park, Showcase- 
 2006 Korea: Groove Party Game, Motion Capture-
 2006 Korea m.net "트렌드 리포트 필",-

2007 others
 2007 Korea Nike BUS Commercial, Photo Shoot- 
 2007 Czech: RedBull, Judge and Workshop- 
 2007 Czechoslovakia: Workshop-
 2007 Belgium: Session, Judge and Workshop- 
 2007 South Africa: Freestyle Session 2007 South Africa, Judge and Workshop-
 2007 Korea: "Wen Jiabao" China's Premier Visit, Showcase- 
 2007 Korea: Nike 1love Air Force 25th Anniversary Party, Showcase- 
 2007 Korea: Battle of the year 2007 Asia, Showcase- 
 2007 Korea: BBoy Park Korea 2007, Showcase-
 2007 France: Battle Of The Year 2007 France, Judge and Workshop- 
 2007 Taiwan: RedBull B.c.one 2007 South east Asia, Exhibition Battle-
 2007 USA: TRIBECA FILM FESTIVAL, Showcase- 
 2007 Korea: CYON B-boy Battle Championship Seoul, Judge- 
 2007 China: NIKE Air Force 1, Showcase- 
 2007 Korea: 8.15 "a Trial tolling Ceremony" - 
 2007 Germany: Battle of the year 2007 international, Judge- 
 2007 Ukraine: Kiev session 2007, Judge- 
 2007 Taiwan: Fun ski &Snow Festival, Showcase- 
 2007 Hongkong: Fun ski &Snow Festival, Showcase-
 2007 Movie: "Turn It Loose" -

2008 others
 2008 Korea: LG CYON Championship Seoul, Judge-
 2008 Japan: Battle of The Year Japan, Judge-
 2008 Japan: Be.Bboy, Judge-
 2008 Spain: Evolution Euro, Judge-
 2008 Australia: Red Bull Club Tour, Showcase-
 2008 Portugal: Bboy Battle, Judge-
 2008 France: Red Bull B.C One, Judge-

2009 others
 2009 Singapore: Battle Of The Year Singapore, Judge-
 2009 China: R-16 China, Judge and Workshop and Showcase-
 2009 USA: LA Tour, Showcase-
 2009 UK: Edinburgh International firm festival, workshop-
 2009 Taiwan: Battle Of The Year Taiwan, Judge-
 2009 Korea: ChunCheon Battle, Judge-
 2009 USA: Evolution, Judge-
 2009 Holland: IBE, Exhibition Battle-
 2009 USA: World Of Dance, Exhibition battle-

2010 others
 2010 USA: Deuces Wild Full Force 15yr Anniversary, Judge-
 2010 France: Break the Floor International, Judge-
 2010 Taiwan: Culture Shock Jam Volume.2, Judge and Exhibition Battle-
 2010 Canada: Just Battle, Showcase and Judge-
 2010 Korea: KBS "어깨동무"-
 2010 Korea: Legend of Bboy, Judge-
 2010 China: R-16, Judge-
 2010 Korea: R-16, Judge-
 2010 Korea: monster jam, Judge-
 2010 Korea: monster jam final, Judge-
 2010 Russia: battle of the year Russia, Judge and Workshop-
 2010 USA: Washington "k-festival", Showcase-
 2010 Japan: osaka Workshop-
 2010 Germany: you are the best@you, Judge and Workshop-
 2010 China: Xuzhou Battle, Judge-
 2010 Taiwan: Red bull b.c one Allstars tour, Showcase and Workshop-
 2010 Japan: Red bull b.c one Allstars tour, Showcase-

2011 others
 2011 hongkong: Red bull b.c one cypher, Judge-
 2011 France: Chelles battle pro, Judge-
 2011 USA: Red bull b.c one Allstars tour, Showcase and Judge and Workshop-
 2011 Qatar: Red bull breaking, Judge and Workshop-
 2011 United Arab Emirates: Red bull breaking, Judge and Workshop-
 2011 Oman: Red bull breaking, Judge and Workshop-
 2011 Kuwait: Red bull breaking, Judge and Workshop-
 2011 Jordan: Red bull breaking, Judge and Workshop-
 2011 Lebanon: Red bull breaking, Judge and Workshop-
 2011 Egypt: Red bull breaking, Judge and Workshop-
 2011 Swiss: Red bull b.c one Allstars tour, Workshop-
 2011 Russia: Red bull b.c one Allstars tour, Judge and Workshop-
 2011 Germany: Urban Dance Camp, showcase and Exhibition Battle-
 2011 Korea: Monster Jam, Judge-
 2011 Korea: Red Bull launching party, Showcase-
 2011 Germany: Battle of the year Germany, Judge-
 2011 Russia: Red bull b.c one Allstars tour, Showcase and Judge and Workshop-
 2011 Thailand: Battle of the year south Asia, Judge-
 2011 Korea: Gatsby Dance Competition 4th, Judge-

2012 others
 2012 Philippines: Red Bull Launching Party, Showcase-
 2012 Korea: Red Bull B.C one Cypher, Judge-
 2012 Korea: "Red Bull CF"-
 2012 hongkong: Red Bull B.C one Cypher, Judge-
 2012 Korea: Red Bull Street style, Judge-
 2012 Korea: KyungNam Battle, Judge-
 2012 Turkey: Underground Funky Base, Judge and Workshop-
 2012 Holland: IBE, Exhibition Battle-
 2012 Korea: JeonJu Grand Prix, Judge-
 2012 Korea: Battle Of The Year Korea, Judge-
 2012 China: Dalian Battle, Judge-

2013 others
 2013 Malaysia: Think You Got Skillz, Judge and Workshop-
 2013 Korea: Dance Alive bboy side, Judge-
 2013 Korea: Rowdedow jam, Judge-
 2013 Korea: busan festival 5vs5 battle, Judge-
 2013 Korea: Illest Battle, Judge-
 2013 Korea: Ready 2 Hustle, Judge-
 2013 Korea: Rookies Tour, Judge-
 2013 Japan: FreeStyle Session World Final, Judge-

2014 others
 2014 China: Red Bull launching Party show case_
 2014 Tajikistan: Red Bull B.C one Cypher, Judge and Workshop-
 2014 Kyrgyzstan: Red Bull B.C one Cypher, Judge and Workshop-
 2014 Uzbekistan: Red Bull B.C one Cypher, Judge and Workshop-
 2014 Georgia(caucasus): Red Bull B.C one Cypher, Judge and Workshop-
 2014 Azerbaijan: Red Bull B.C one Cypher, Judge and Workshop-
 2014 Korea: Brown Breath 14SS Campaign ‘Spread the message’Shooting-
 2014 France: Red Bull B.C one Cypher, Workshop-
 2014 Switzerland: Red Bull B.C one Cypher, Judge and Workshop-
 2014 Korea: Red Bull B.C one Cypher,  Seoul and Busan,  Judge and Workshop
 2014 Korea: UK TV Show  ”Gadget Show” Shooting-
 2014 Russia: All Generation 5 Battle, Judge and Workshop-
 2014 Finland: Red Bull B.C one Cypher, Judge-
 2014 Taiwan: Red Bull B.C one Cypher, Judge and Workshop Tour-
 2014 Korea: Boom Jam Korea, Judge-
 2014 Slovakia: Catch The Flava Workshop, Out Break Europe Judge and Workshop-
 2014 Korea: World Youth Culture EXPO in Busan, Bboy Battle Judge-
 2014 Romania: Black Sea Dance Camp, Workshop and Photo shooting-
 2014 Japan: UK Bboy Championship Japan, Judge-
 2014 Croatia:  Red Bull B.C one Eastern European Final, Judge and Workshop-
 2014 Japan: “We Got Seoul” Showcase-
 2014 USA: Apple IOS8 Slow Motion Shooting-
 2014 Korea: World Street Dance Festival, Judge-
 2014 Russia: Red Bull B.C one Tour in Russia, Judge and Workshop-
 2014 China: Red Bull Tour in Shenzhen, Shanghai, Showcase and Workshop-

2015 others
 2015 Korea: RowDEDOW Jam Vol.3, Judge-
 2015 Japan: King Of College, Judge-
 2015 Taiwan: Culture Shock Vol.5, Judge-
 2015 France: Chelles Battle Pro 2015 World Final, Judge-
 2015 Austria: Red Bull B.C one Austria Cypher, Judge and Workshop-
 2015 China: Happy Vally Battle, Judge and Workshop-
 2015 Korea: Shiseido Sunscreen CF Shooting-
 2015 Uzbekistan:  Red Bull B.C one Uzbekistan Cypher, Judge and Workshop-
 2015 Mongolia: R-16 Qualification, Judge-
 2015 Egypt: Red Bull B.C one Egypt Cypher, Judge and Workshop-
 2015 Qatar: Red Bull B.C one Qatar Cypher, Judge-
 2015 Lebanon: Red Bull B.C one Lebanon Cypher, Judge-
 2015 India: Red Bull B.C one India Cypher, Judge and Workshop-
 2015 Singapore: BOTY & R-16 Qualification, Judge-
 2015 Italy: The Week Camp, Judge and Workshop-
 2015 USA: R-16 Qualification, Judge and Workshop-
 2015 China: Born 2 Dance, Judge-
 2015 China: Shijixing Culture Media Workshop-
 2015 Singapore: BOTY & FreeStyle Session South East Asia, Judge-
 2015 China: Turn Up Guiyang, Judge-
 2015 Egypt: Red Bull B.C one Middle East Africa Final, Judge-
 2015 Korea: Red Bull B.C one Asia final, Judge-
 2015 China: Bomb Jam Vol.7, Judge-
 2015 Italy: Red Bull B.C one Final, Workshop-
 2015 USA: Red Bull Miami, Showcase-
 2015 Italy: Nutcracker Show in Opera, Showcase-

2016 others
 2016 Korea: Marseile Battle Pro Qualification, Judge-
 2016 Finland: Battle For Peace, Judge and Workshop-
 2016 Madagascar: Battle For Peace, Judge and Workshop-
 2016 U.A.E: Red Bull B.C one Dubai Cypher, Judge and Workshop-
 2016 France: Red Bull B.C one Allstars OnTour, Workshop and Shooting-
 2016 China: Happy Vally Battle, Judge and Workshop-
 2016 India: Red Bull B.C one Delhi, Mumbai City Cypher, Judge and workshop-
 2016 India: Red Bull B.C one India Cypher, Judge and workshop-
 2016 Mexico: Red Bull B.C one Mexico Cypher, Judge and workshop-
 2016 China: Happy Vally Battle in Tianjin, Judge and Workshop-
 2016 China: Make Some Noise in Hefei city, Judge and Workshop-
 2016 China: Boom Shakalaka in Ningbo city, Judge and Workshop-
 2016 Korea: Red Bull B.C one Korea Cypher, Judge-
 2016 France: Red Bull B.C one France Cypher, Judge-
 2016 Japan: Battle Of The Year Japan Qualification, Judge-
 2016 China: WDG, Judge-
 2016 China: Challenge Cup, Judge-
 2016 Japan: Japan Road Trip Tour, Judge and Workshop-
 2016 Japan: Kyoto Crawl up Movement Vol.6, Judge-
 2016 Taiwan: Personal Teaching sponsored by Remix brand-
 2016 Germany: Battle Of The Year, Judge-
 2016 China: BAMA2016, Judge and Workshop-
 2016 China: Bboy Unity Vol2, Judge and Workshop-
 2016 Norway: Pop What You Got, Judge-
 2016 Taiwan: Taipei Bboy City, Judge-

2017 others
 2017 USA: Las Vegas Special Workshop-
 2017 USA: W.o.d shooting in NBC-
 2017 France: French Tour, Workshop and Shooting-
 2017 Japan: RoadTrip, around 10citys in Japan for Workshop and Judge and Shooting-
 2017 Korea: Interview by Arena magazine-
 2017 Korea: Team G-Shock Show with Jinjo Crew -
 2017 France: Just Debout Show with BconeAllstars-
 2017 UK: Delta Connection, Judge-
 2017 China: We are One 2017, Show with Jinjo Crew -
 2017 Jordan: Red Bull B.C one Jordan Cypher, Judge and Workshop-
 2017 Japan: Red Bull Air Race, Show-
 2017 China: WDC China in Xian, Judge and Workshop-
 2017 Singapore: Free Style Session Singapore, Judge-
 2017 Korea: Pop Up Class in FRZM Dance Studio-
 2017 Bahrain: Red Bull B.C One Bahrain Cypher, Judge and Workshop-
 2017 Holland: IBE Red Bull Residency, Judge and Workshop-
 2017 China; Bboy In Shanghai(B.I.S), Judge-
 2017 Korea: BBIC World Final, Judge and Show with Jinjo Crew -
 2017 Korea: Red Bull B.C One All Stars Korea Tour, Workshop and Exhibition Battle-
 2017 Korea: G-Shock Crazy Toughness Vol.1, Organize and Show with Jinjo Crew- 
 2017 China: Dance Lord Vol.3 in Nanning, Judge and Workshop-
 2017 Holland: Red Bull B.C One World Final in Amsterdam, Judge-
 2017 China: WDH Vol.2 in Xiamen, Judge and Workshop-

2018 others
 2018 Korea: Golden 9 Dance Championship, Judge-
 2018 Switzerland: Red Bull B.C One World Final Commercial, Shooting-
 2018 Korea: Battle Pro Korea, Judge-
 2018 Japan: Floorriorz 8th Anniversary, Exhibition Battle-
 2018 France: Red Bull B.C One All Stars Europe Tour, Exhibition Battle And Workshop-
 2018 Austria: Red Bull B.C One All Stars Europe Tour, Shooting-
 2018 Czech: Red Bull B.C One All Stars Europe Tour, Shooting-
 2018 India: Red Bull B.C One India Tour, Judge and Workshop and Shooting-
 2018 Spain: Red Bull B.C One Spain Camp, Judge and Workshop-
 2018 Tunisia: Red Bull B.C One Tunisia Cypher Judge, Workshop, Shooting-
 2018 Algeria: Red Bull B.C One Algeria Cypher Judge, Workshop, Shooting-
 2018 Morocco: Red Bull B.C One Morocco Cypher Judge, Workshop, Shooting-
 2018 USA: Super cr3w show in Las Vegas-
 2018 Korea: Red Bull B.C One Korea Cypher Judge-
 2018 China: Rich Dance Competition in Yanji Judge-
 2018 South Africa: Red Bull B.C One South Africa Cypher Judge, Workshop, Shooting-
 2018 Holland: W.B.C Judge and Workshop-
 2018 Finland: competition judge and workshop-
 2018 Holland: I.B.E shooting and judge-
 2018 Israel: Battle Of The Year Israel Judge-
 2018 China: Turn Up Street Dance Festival Judge And Workshop-
 2018 Korea: Pole Dance Camp Vol.2 Workshop-
 2018 Switzerland: Red Bull B.C One Last Chance Cypher Judge-
 2018 Korea: G-Shock Shock the World Seoul, Judge-
 2018 Korea: Battle is over, Judge-
 2018 Vietnam: HipFest International, Judge-
 2018 Greece: Battle Of The Best, Judge and Workshop-

2019 others
 2019 China: Shanghai Legend Camp, Workshop-
 2019 Korea: Jason Derulo, Lay, NCT127 _ MV( Let's shut up and Dance) Shooting-
 2019 Turkey: Red Bull B.C One Turkey Cypher Judge and Workshop-
 2019 Poland: Red Bull B.C One Poland Cypher Judge and Workshop-

See also
 List of dancers

External links
 Red Bull BC One http://www.redbullbcone.com
 Hong10 Instagram  https://instagram.com/bboyhongten?igshid=1dv1t2qux3xez
 Hong10 Facebook Page https://www.facebook.com/hong10official/
 Hong10 Facebook https://www.facebook.com/bboyhongten
 Hong10 YouTube https://www.youtube.com/user/7commandoz
 Skillzxxx http://skillzxxx.com/
 Drifterz YouTube https://www.youtube.com/watch?v=_OoRrIZ-32c

References 

South Korean breakdancers
1985 births
Living people